Gach kersa (also Romanized as Gach kersā) is a village in Dasht-e Lali Rural District, in the Central District of Lali County, Khuzestan Province, Iran. At the 2006 census, its population was 1,618, in 222 families.

References 

Populated places in Lali County